Elena Micheli (born 29 April 1999) is an Italian modern pentathlete. She won the gold medal in the women's individual event at the 2022 World Modern Pentathlon Championships held in Alexandria, Egypt. She also won the silver medal in the women's individual event at the 2019 World Modern Pentathlon Championships held in Budapest, Hungary. She represented Italy in the women's event at the 2020 Summer Olympics in Tokyo, Japan.

References

External links 

Living people
1999 births
Place of birth missing (living people)
Italian female modern pentathletes
World Modern Pentathlon Championships medalists
Modern pentathletes at the 2020 Summer Olympics
Olympic modern pentathletes of Italy
21st-century Italian women